Notable people and characters named Sydney include:

Given name 
Sydney Allard (1910–1966), British car company founder
Sydney Ancher (1904–1978), Australian architect
Sydney Atkinson (1901–1977), South African athlete
Sydney D. Bailey (1916–1995), English author and pacifist
Sydney Barnes (1873–1967), English cricketer
Sydney Brenner (1927–2019), South African biologist
Sydney Brown (American football) (born 2000), Canadian American football player
Sydney Savory Buckman (1860–1929), British palaeontologist
Sydney Camm, (1893–1966), English aeronautical engineer
Sydney Chaplin (1885–1965), English actor
Sydney Earle Chaplin (1926–2009), American actor
Sidney Chu (born 1999), Hong Kong short track speed skater 
Syd Cohen, American baseball pitcher
Sydney Dacres (1805–1884), English admiral
Sydney "Syd" Einfeld (1909–1995), Australian politician and Jewish community leader
Sydney F. Foster (1893–1973), Chief Judge of the New York Court of Appeals
Sydney Fremantle (1867–1958), English admiral
Sydney Greenstreet (1879–1954), English actor
Sydney Grundy (1848–1914), English dramatist
Sydney Gun-Munro (1916–2007), Saint Vincent and the Grenadines politician
Sydney J. Harris (1917–1986), American journalist
Sydney Horler (1888–1954), British novelist
Sydney Jacobson, Baron Jacobson (1908–1988), British journalist
Sydney Kamlager (born 1972), American politician
Sydney Kentridge (born 1922), South African lawyer and judge
Sydney Lamb (born 1929), American linguist
Sydney Laurence (1865–1940), American painter
Sydney Leroux Dwyer (born 1990), Canada-born American soccer player
Sydney Magruder Washington, American ballet dancer and blogger
Sydney Mancasola, American opera soprano
Sydney Mikayla (born 2003), American actress
Sydney Mufamadi (born 1959), South African politician
Sydney Newman (1917–1997), Canadian film and television producer
Sydney Omarr (1926–2003), American astrologist
Sydney Park (actress) (born 1997), American actress and comedian
Sydney Parkinson (1745–1771), Scottish illustrator
Sydney Penny (born 1971), American actress
Sydney Tamiia Poitier (born 1973), Bahamanian-American actress, daughter of Sidney Poitier
Sydney Pollack (1934–2008), American film actor
Sydney Possuelo (born 1940), Brazilian explorer and ethnographer 
Sydney Ringer (1836–1910), British pharmacologist
Sydney Rossman (born 1995), American ice hockey player
Sydney Schanberg (born 1934), American journalist
Sydney Sekeramayi (born 1944), Zimbabwean politician
Sydney Shoemaker (born 1931), American philosopher
Sydney Skaife (1889–1976), South African entomologist 
Sydney Sierota (born 1997), lead singer of Echosmith
Sydney Silverman (1895–1968), British politician
Sydney Simmons (1840–1924), British entrepreneur and philanthropist
Sydney Smirke (1798–1877), English architect
Sydney Smith (1771–1845), English writer
Sydney Sweeney (born 1997), American actress
Sydney Taylor (1904–1978), American author
Sydney James Van Pelt (1908–1976), Australian medical practitioner
Sydney J. Van Scyoc (born 1939), American science fiction writer
Sydney Rae White (born 1991), English actress and singer
Sydney de Zoysa (1909–1994), Sri Lankan Sinhala police officer

Surname 
Algernon Sydney (1623–1683), English politician
Berenice Sydney (1944–1983), English artist 
Grahame Sydney (born 1948), New Zealand artist
Harry Sydney (born 1959), American football player 
Joan Sydney (1936–2022), English actress
Robin Sydney (born 1984), American actress

Fictional characters 
Sydney Andrews, character in the television series Melrose Place
Sydney Bristow, character in the television series Alias
Sydney Carton, character in the novel A Tale of Two Cities
Sydney Drew, character in the television series Power Rangers: S.P.D.
Sydney Fox, character in the television series Relic Hunter
Sydney Losstarot, character in the video game Vagrant Story
Sydney Novak, character in the television series I Am Not Okay With This
Sydney, character in the television series The Pretender
Kevin Sydney, fictional character in the X-Men comic series

See also
 Sidney (surname)
 Sidney (given name)

English-language surnames
English given names
English unisex given names
English masculine given names
English feminine given names